Drnovice is a municipality and village in Vyškov District in the South Moravian Region of the Czech Republic. It has about 2,400 inhabitants.

Geography
It lies on the border between the Vyškov Gate and Drahany Highlands. The Drnůvka Stream flows through the municipality.

History
The first written mention of Drnovice is from 1104.

Sport
The municipality was home to football club 1. FK Drnovice, which took part in the Czech First League for 10 seasons between 1993 and 2005. Drnovice is the second smallest municipality that has ever been represented in the Czech First League (after Blšany). The club was dissolved in 2006 due to financial trouble. Its successor is a club named FKD and is plays only in amateur competitions.

Sights
The parish Church of Saint Lawrence was built in the second half of the 17th century, after the old church was demolished in 1652. Next to the church there are Baroque statues of Saint John of Nepomuk from 1738 and Saint Florian from 1755.

Drnovice Castle dates from 1866–1869. Today it houses the municipal office and a restaurant.

Notable people
Gisela Januszewska (1867–1943), Austrian physician
Alexander Roda Roda (1872–1945), Austrian writer

References

External links

Villages in Vyškov District